One Line, Two Views is an album by Muhal Richard Abrams which was released on the New World label in 1995 and features performances of seven of Abrams' compositions by Abrams, Eddie Allen, Patience Higgins, Marty Ehrlich, Bryan Carrott, Mark Feldman, Tony Cedras, Anne LeBaron, Lindsey Horner, and Reggie Nicholson.

Reception
The Allmusic review by Scott Yanow states "Pianist/composer extraordinaire Abrams needs no preface for his singular-minded, forward-thinking music, save that this recording might represent its zenith. Jazz contexts, progressive ideals, improv within deft frameworks — it's all here... This is certainly Abrams' shining hour — one of many bright moments for a pivotal American icon".

Track listing
All compositions by Muhal Richard Abrams
 "Textures 95" - 7:10  
 "The Prism 3" - 9:18  
 "Hydepth" - 13:34  
 "Tribute to Julius Hemphill and Don Pullen" - 4:07  
 "One Line, Two Views" - 11:55  
 "11 Over 4" - 12:02  
 "Ensemble Song" - 18:37  
Recorded on June 23 & 24, 1995 at Electric Lady Studios, NYC

Personnel
Muhal Richard Abrams: piano, synthesizer, percussion, voice
Eddie Allen: trumpet, percussion, voice
Patience Higgins: tenor saxophone, bass clarinet, percussion, voice
Marty Ehrlich: alto saxophone, bass clarinet, percussion, voice
Bryan Carrott: vibraphone, percussion, voice
Mark Feldman: violin, percussion, voice
Tony Cedras: accordion, percussion, voice
Anne LeBaron: harp, percussion, voice
Lindsey Horner: bass, percussion, voice
Reggie Nicholson: drums, percussion, voice

References

1995 albums
Muhal Richard Abrams albums
New World Records albums